Valmir Lucas de Oliveira, the Valmir Lucas born in the Edéia is a centre back who plays in the Goiás.

Career
Revealed in the basic categories of Goiás, in the first team currently plays in the club, plays in the Goiás.

Career statistics
(Correct )

Contract
 Goiás.

References

External links
 ogol
 soccerway

1989 births
Living people
Brazilian footballers
Campeonato Brasileiro Série A players
Campeonato Brasileiro Série B players
Goiás Esporte Clube players
Association football defenders